Lutfur Rahman George (born 1 July 1963) is a Bangladeshi television and film actor.   He has worked in films like Aguner Poroshmoni and Aynabaji. He is currently the organizational editor of Actors’ Equity Bangladesh.

Career
Lutfur started his acting career in theatre in 1985, working with the renowned company, Nagorik Natya Sampradaya. He went on to essay the role of Mojnu, in Humayun Ahmed's hit television series, Kothao Keu Nei. He then starred in Aguner Poroshmoni (1994) directed by Humayun Ahmed and Pokamakorer Ghorbosoti (1996). Then he concentrated on business away from acting for 14 years. After that he returned to acting after recovering from a heart attack. His role in Mostofa Sarwar Farooki's TV drama 420 was also highly praised.

Filmography
 Aguner Poroshmoni (1994)
Pokamakorer Ghorbosoti (1996)
 Bailey Road (2011)
 Mrittika Maya (2013)
 Aynabaji (2016)
 Gohin Baluchor (2017)
 Voyonkor Sundor (2017)
 Kaler Putul (2018)
 Iti, Tomari Dhaka (2019)
 Indubala (2019)
 Poran (2022)
 Radio (Upcoming)

Television

TV series

 Kothao Keu Nei
 420
 Hawai Mithai
 Atmoj (Attoj)
 Kaal Nitur Biye
 Buker Bam Pashe
 Mashrafe Junior
 Zindabahar (2022)

Telefilm

Web series

References

External links
 

1963 births
Living people
Bangladeshi male film actors
Bangladeshi male television actors